The New England hurricane may refer to:

1815 New England hurricane
1938 New England hurricane
1940 New England hurricane
 List of New England hurricanes